Murraysville is an extinct town in Lorain County, in the U.S. state of Ohio. It was located in Carlisle Township.

History
A post office called Murraysville was established in 1828, and remained in operation until 1847. The town was named for the proprietor of Murray's Mills, a local watermill.  In the mid 1800s it had a saw mill, grist mill, general store, school, and about 25 houses.

References

Geography of Lorain County, Ohio
Ghost towns in Ohio